Kwandwane "Kwan" Browne (born 11 December 1977 in Belmont, Trinidad and Tobago) is a Trinidadian field hockey player.

He has represented Trinidad and Tobago internationally at the Commonwealth Games, Pan American Games and Pan American Cup.

Browne plays club hockey for Hampstead and Westminster as a player/coach, having previously played for Canterbury and East Grinstead.

On 24 September 2019 it was announced that Browne had been appointed as Assistant Coach for the Great Britain national team.

In 2020, he became the head of hockey at Mill Hill School in London.

References

External links

1977 births
Trinidad and Tobago male field hockey players
Sportspeople from Port of Spain
Field hockey players at the 1998 Commonwealth Games
Field hockey players at the 2006 Commonwealth Games
Field hockey players at the 2010 Commonwealth Games
Field hockey players at the 2014 Commonwealth Games
Living people
East Grinstead Hockey Club players
Hampstead & Westminster Hockey Club players
Hampstead & Westminster Hockey Club coaches
Commonwealth Games competitors for Trinidad and Tobago